A buchetta shop or sportello shop is a shop which sells goods through a small hole in the wall; the hole is called a buchetta or sportello (literally, a small opening or window). Such shops are typical of Tuscany, Italy. Many buchettas are found in the historic center of Florence.

Buchettas are typically of similar dimensions, about 30cm tall and 15cm wide, and arched at the top, but are otherwise very diverse in style. They were usually built into the streetside walls of the palaces of aristocrats, usually near the main entrance, and may be quite ornate. They were closed outside of opening hours with a hatch, which might be painted various colours, or with a still life or religious painting. Many hatches are now missing, and some buchettas are disused and have been sealed off.


History

In 1559, Cosimo I de' Medici, Grand Duke of Tuscany, permitted agriculturalists to sell their wine directly to consumers at their residences. As a result, the servants of the rich Florentine houses sold wine from the lord's estates through tiny windows, just large enough to pass a flask through, which came to be called s. This significantly weakened the power of the wine guilds. At the beginning of the 1900s, the laws on selling wine changed, the palaces were subdivided, and many buchettas were bricked up, or converted to doorbells or mailboxes or niches. A flood in 1966 destroyed many wooden components, but exposed at least one buchetta which had been plastered over, leading to its restoration.

During the plagues of the Renaissance, the sportellos were used as a low-contagion-risk way of conducting commerce. In the COVID-19 pandemic, buchettas were reopened to serve that function again. Food, drinks, and gelato were sold.

In 2014, Robbin Gheesling completed and extensive street photography project of the Wine Doors of Florence.

References

Further reading

 
  (The Wine Windows Association) maps and seeks protection for buchettas.

Architectural elements
Shops in Italy
Infection-control measures
Renaissance architecture
Arches and vaults
Florence
Windows